The state of Tamil Nadu has operated a Unicameral system since 1 November 1986. The Tamil Nadu Legislative Assembly alone has powers to legislate laws covering state. , it comprises members from 234 constituencies, whom are democratically elected using the First-past-the-post system. The presiding officer of the Assembly is called the Speaker. The term of the Assembly is five years unless it is dissolved earlier.

Current list of constituencies 
Constituencies were delimited in 2007 based on the 2001 Census of India and following draft proposals. Some constituencies are reserved for candidates from the Scheduled Castes and Scheduled Tribes. The first general elections following the delimitation exercise were those of 2011.

References 

 
Tamil Nadu
Constituencies